The Hacettepe Journal of Mathematics and Statistics is an English-language bimonthly peer-reviewed journal for original research into mathematics and statistics. The journal is published by Hacettepe University Faculty of science.

Abstracting and indexing
According to the Journal Citation Reports, the journal has a 2014 impact factor of 0.413 . The journal is indexed in SCI-EXP, Journal Citation Reports, Mathematical Reviews, Zentralblatt MATH, Current Index to Statistics, Statistical Theory & Method Abstracts, SCOPUS, Tübitak-Ulakbim.

External links 
Official site

References 

Mathematics journals
Statistics journals
Open access journals
Bimonthly journals
English-language journals